Sudbury may refer to:

Places

Australia
 Sudbury Reef, Queensland

Canada
 Greater Sudbury, Ontario 
 Sudbury (electoral district)
 Sudbury (provincial electoral district)
 Sudbury Airport
 Sudbury Basin, a meteorite impact crater and nickel mining district
 Sudbury District, Ontario, which surrounds but does not include Greater Sudbury

United Kingdom
 Sudbury, Derbyshire, England
 HM Prison Sudbury
 Sudbury Rural District 1894–1934
 Sudbury, Suffolk, England
 Sudbury (UK Parliament constituency)
 Sudbury, London, England
 Sudbury, former name of Sedbury, Gloucestershire, England

United States
 Sudbury, Massachusetts
 Sudbury River, Massachusetts
 Sudbury, Vermont

Military
 HMCS Sudbury, a Royal Canadian Navy corvette 1941–1945
 RAF Sudbury, a Royal Air Force station in Sudbury, Suffolk, England 1943–1945
 USS Sudbury (ID-2149), US Navy cargo ship 1918–1919

People
 Sudbury baronets, a title of Eldon, Durham, England
 John Sudbury (1604–1684), Dean of Durham
 Simon Sudbury (c. 1316 – 1381), an Archbishop of Canterbury (1375–1381) and Bishop of London

Other uses
 A.F.C. Sudbury, a football club in Sudbury, Suffolk, England
 Sudbury Town F.C., a football club based in Sudbury, Suffolk, England 1885–1999
 Sudbury (TV pilot), based on the 1998 film Practical Magic
 Sudbury Valley School, in Framingham, Massachusetts, U.S.
 Sudbury school, a type of school with direct democracy

See also

 Sudbury railway station (disambiguation)
 Sunbury (disambiguation)
 Sudbury Neutrino Observatory,  in Sudbury, Ontario, Canada